7-Methyl-1,5,7-triazabicyclo[4.4.0]dec-5-ene (mTBD) is a bicyclic strong guanidine base (pKa = 25.43 in CH3CN and pKa = 17.9 in THF). mTBD, like 1,5,7-triazabicyclo[4.4.0]dec-5-ene and other guanidine super bases, can be used as a catalyst in a variety of chemical reactions. It also reacts with CO2, which could make it useful for carbon capture and storage.

When brought into contact with some acids, mTBD reacts to form an ionic liquid. Some of these ionic liquids can dissolve cellulose.

References

Catalysts
Guanidines
Pyrimidopyrimidines
Amines
Reagents for organic chemistry
Superbases